UFC Fight Night: Rodríguez vs. Penn (also known as UFC Fight Night 103) was a mixed martial arts event produced by the Ultimate Fighting Championship held on January 15, 2017, at Talking Stick Resort Arena in Phoenix, Arizona

Background
This was the second event the organization hosted in Phoenix.

A featherweight bout between The Ultimate Fighter: Latin America featherweight winner Yair Rodríguez and former UFC Lightweight and Welterweight Champion B.J. Penn served as the event headliner. This was Penn's first fight in the organization in over two-and-a-half years.

Erik Koch was expected to face Anthony Rocco Martin at the event. However, Koch pulled out of the fight on December 12 citing injury and was replaced by Alex White.

Damian Grabowski was expected to face Viktor Pešta at the event. However, Grabowski was removed from the bout on December 21 for undisclosed reasons and was replaced by Alexey Oleynik.

On December 29, two bouts suffered alterations: Jussier Formiga pulled out from his bout against Sergio Pettis and Jordan Rinaldi from his bout against Devin Powell. They were replaced by former UFC Flyweight Championship challenger John Moraga and promotional newcomer Drakkar Klose, respectively.

Bryan Caraway was expected to face Jimmie Rivera at the event. However, Caraway pulled out of the bout on January 4 citing an undisclosed injury. He was replaced by Marlon Vera. Eventually, Rivera pulled from the fight as he felt going from a top-5 ranked fighter to an unranked one wouldn't make sense at that moment.

Results

Bonus awards
The following fighters were awarded $50,000 bonuses:
Fight of the Night: Augusto Mendes vs. Frankie Saenz
Performance of the Night: Yair Rodríguez and Oleksiy Oliynyk

Reported payout
The following is the reported payout to the fighters as reported to the Arizona Boxing & Mixed Martial Arts Commission. It does not include sponsor money and also does not include the UFC's traditional "fight night" bonuses. The total disclosed payout for the event was $841,000. 
 Yair Rodríguez: $100,000 (includes $50,000 win bonus) def. B.J. Penn: $150,000
 Joe Lauzon: $116,000 (includes $58,000 win bonus) def. Marcin Held: $20,000
 Ben Saunders: $40,000 (includes $20,000 win bonus) def.  Court McGee: $35,000
 Sergio Pettis: $54,000 (includes $27,000 win bonus) def. John Moraga: $28,000
 Drakkar Klose: $20,000 (includes $10,000 win bonus) def. Devin Powell: $10,000
 Augusto Mendes: $20,000 (includes $10,000 win bonus) def. Frankie Saenz: $20,000
 Oleksiy Oliynyk: $48,000 (includes $24,000 win bonus) def. Viktor Pešta: $10,000
 Tony Martin: $32,000 (includes $16,000 win bonus) def. Alex White: $14,000
 Nina Ansaroff: $20,000 (includes $10,000 win bonus) def. Jocelyn Jones-Lybarger: $10,000
 Walt Harris: $24,000 (includes $12,000 win bonus) def. Chase Sherman: $10,000
 Joachim Christensen: $20,000 (includes $10,000 win bonus) def. Bojan Mihajlović: $10,000
 Cyril Asker: $20,000 (includes $10,000 win bonus) def. Dmitrii Smoliakov: $10,000

See also
List of UFC events
2017 in UFC

References

Events in Phoenix, Arizona
UFC Fight Night
Mixed martial arts in Arizona
Sports competitions in Phoenix, Arizona
2017 in mixed martial arts
2017 in sports in Arizona
January 2017 sports events in the United States